Phakellia is a genus of sponges belonging to the family Bubaridae. The genus has a cosmopolitan distribution.

Species
The genus contains the following species:

References

Sponges
Sponge genera
Taxa named by James Scott Bowerbank